Huddersfield Town's 1972–73 campaign saw Town get relegated for the second season in a row, which saw them drop into the 3rd Division for the first time in their history. Despite the 17 goals of new signing Alan Gowling from Manchester United, Town were relegated by goal average from Cardiff City, who were beaten by Town to the 1st Division title in 1924.

Squad at the start of the season

Review
Following the relegation of Town from 1st Division at the end of the previous season, Town's three most experienced players, Trevor Cherry, Roy Ellam and Frank Worthington all left for pastures new, but the money received from their transfers was used to sign the experience of Alan Gowling from Manchester United and Graham Pugh from Sheffield Wednesday. However, a rise back up to Division 1 had a bad start, with Town drawing most of their opening matches and not making any realistic ground on any of the promotion chasing teams such as Burnley and Queens Park Rangers.

Town had only 7 wins in the league by the end of the season, with Town needing to win the last game of the season at home to Portsmouth to have any chance of Town avoiding the unthinkable drop to Division 3. Town beat Pompey 2–0 thanks to goals from Mick Fairclough and new signing Phil Summerill gave Town the needed win, but they had to wait on other results to go their way. Cardiff City got their needed result from their game in hand, which relegated Town on goal average. It was revenge on Town, who pipped Cardiff to the 1st Division title in 1924. They finished 21st with 33 points, getting relegated to Division 3 with Brighton & Hove Albion.

Squad at the end of the season

Results

Division Two

FA Cup

Football League Cup

Appearances and goals

1972-73
English football clubs 1972–73 season